Cantallops is a municipality in the comarca of the Alt Empordà in Girona, Catalonia, Spain. It is situated below the Albera Range, and is linked to La Jonquera by the GI-601 road.

The town originated around the ancient Cantallops castle, documented since the 13th century. Currently, only partial remains remain, a fragment of the wall and a single tower that, in the 19th century, was converted into a bell tower of the parochial church of Sant Esteve.

Demography

References

 Panareda Clopés, Josep Maria; Rios Calvet, Jaume; Rabella Vives, Josep Maria (1989). Guia de Catalunya, Barcelona: Caixa de Catalunya.  (Spanish).  (Catalan).

External links
Official website 
 Government data pages 

Municipalities in Alt Empordà
Populated places in Alt Empordà